The 1904 Campeonato Paulista, organized by the LPF (Liga Paulista de Football), was the 3rd season of São Paulo's top association football league. São Paulo Athletic won the title for the 3rd time. no teams were relegated and the top scorers were São Paulo Athletic's Herbert Boyes and Charles Miller with 9 goals.

System
The championship was disputed in a double-round robin system, with the team with the most points winning the title. The last-placed team would dispute a playoff against a non-league team, Internacional de Santos, to remain in the league.

Championship

Relegation Playoffs

|}

Finals

References

Campeonato Paulista seasons
Paulista